Jesús María may refer to:

Argentina
 Jesús María, Córdoba

Colombia
 Jesus María, Santander

Cuba
 Jesús María, Havana, a ward of Old Havana

Mexico
 Jesús María, Aguascalientes
 Jesús María, Nayarit
 Jesús María, Jalisco
 Jesús María (El Zapote), San Martín de Hidalgo, Jalisco
 Villa Jesús María, in Baja California
 Roman Catholic Territorial Prelature of Jesús María del Nayar

Peru
 Jesús María District, Lima

United States
Jesus Maria, California, an unincorporated community